William Timothy Cape (25 October 1806 – 4 June 1863) was an early school master in Sydney, Australia; several of the Premiers of New South Wales attended his school.

Cape was born at Walworth, Surrey, England, the son of William Cape, a London bank manager who emigrated to Australia with his family in 1821. Cape senior became master of a private school, the Sydney Academy, at the end of 1822 and died in 1847.

William Timothy Cape was educated at the Merchant Taylors' School, London, and was intended for the Church of England ministry. However, on his arrival in Australia, became an assistant master at his father's school. Though just 20 years of age he was made headmaster of the Sydney public school on 1 July 1827 when his father resigned. He had already made a reputation as a teacher and shortly afterwards, when a number of public school teachers from the country were brought into Sydney for training, Cape was given charge of them as he was considered the only qualified person available. In 1829 he opened a private school in King Street, Sydney, and when the Sydney College was founded in 1835 he transferred his own pupils there on being appointed headmaster.

For seven years Cape was a successful headmaster; some of his distinguished pupils included Sir John Robertson, William Forster, William Bede Dalley, Sir James Martin, and T. A. Browne, and the number of students was approaching 300 when Cape came into conflict with the trustees and resigned at the end of 1841. This was disastrous for the school, for though the number of pupils kept up for some time, between 1843 and 1847 there was a drop in numbers from 283 to 62. The colony was passing through bad times, but it is clear that the trustees had not been able to find a successor who could approach Cape in personality and knowledge. Cape in the meantime had opened a private school at Paddington, which was carried on until 1856 when he retired.

In 1859 Cape was elected a member of the New South Wales Legislative Assembly for Wollombi, and interested himself in the educational life of the colony as a commissioner of national education, a fellow of St Paul's College of the University of Sydney, and in connexion with the Sydney School of Arts. He visited England in 1855 and was again in England 1860–1863. He died at London on 14 June 1863. 

A memorial was placed in St Andrew's cathedral by his former pupils, however it was destroyed in 1941 during renovation.

References

 

1806 births
1863 deaths
Australian headmasters
Members of the New South Wales Legislative Assembly
People educated at Merchant Taylors' School, Northwood
Sydney Grammar School headmasters
19th-century Australian politicians